Aliskiren/amlodipine/hydrochlorothiazide, sold under the brand name Amturnide, is a fixed-dose combination medication that is used to treat high blood pressure. It contains aliskiren, amlodipine, and hydrochlorothiazide. It is taken by mouth.

It was approved for medical use in the United States in December 2010. Amturnide was withdrawn by Novartis from the US market in 2017.

References

External links
 
 

Combination drugs
Novartis brands
Withdrawn drugs